Discovery Science India is a science television channel owned by Discovery India. The channel was launched in 2010. From 1 March 2021, it began to follow a timeshifted schedule of the Southeast Asia feed.

Currently, the channel does not show any new programs and telecast repeated shows of more than 5 years ago.

Programming

See also
 Discovery Science (TV channel)
 Science Channel

References

India
English-language television stations in India
Television stations in Mumbai
Television channels and stations established in 2010
2010 establishments in Maharashtra